2019 Czech Lion Awards ceremony was held on 7 March 2020. It will be moderated by Václav Kopta. Nominations were announced on 15 January 2020. Owners received highest number of nominations. The Painted Bird then won in 9 categories including the Best film.

Schedule

Winners and nominees
Nominations were announced on 15 January 2020. Owners received 12 nominations. The Painted Bird was nominated for 11 categories and won non-statutory award for the Best Poster.  Old-Timers was third most successful film with 10 nominations.

On 10 February 2020 nominations in television Categories were announced.

Ceremony was held on 8 March 2020. The Painted Bird has won 9 Awards.

Non-statutory Awards

Films with multiple wins and nominations

References

2019 film awards
Czech Lion Awards ceremonies